Miana Mohra (population c. 5000, area c. 1 km2) is a village located in Rawalpindi District, Pakistan. It is northeast of Chakwal and about 80 km southwest of Rawalpindi. It is primarily agricultural, though some residents work for the Pakistani government.

The literacy rate is almost 100% both in men and women. There are six mosques including two Jamia Mosques.

Punjabi culture predominates in the village. Most people wear shalwar qamiz.

Miana Mohra is a market place for surrounding villages. It has a bazaar, bank and schools.

Populated places in Rawalpindi District